William Raymond Barry (October 4, 1928 – August 28, 2018) was an American-born Canadian professional ice hockey player who played 18 games in the National Hockey League with the Boston Bruins during the 1951–52 season.

Early life 
Barry was born in Revere, Massachusetts, and raised in Edmonton, Alberta.

Career 
Barry spent most of his career, which lasted from 1948 to 1957 in the minor Western Hockey League, though split the 1951–52 season between the NHL and the minor American Hockey League. Barry scored his lone NHL goal in Boston's 4–1 loss to Toronto at Boston Garden on November 25, 1951.

Personal life 
He died on August 28, 2018 in Calgary.

Career statistics

Regular season and playoffs

References

External links

1928 births
2018 deaths
American men's ice hockey centers
Calgary Stampeders (WHL) players
Canadian ice hockey centres
Boston Bruins players
Hershey Bears players
Ice hockey players from Massachusetts
People from Revere, Massachusetts
Ice hockey people from Edmonton
Toronto St. Michael's Majors players